Season 1 of the Indian Telugu-language competitive reality TV series MasterChef India – Telugu was aired from 27 August 2021 to 27 November 2021 on Gemini TV. Tamannaah hosted the initial 16 episodes of the season and Anasuya Bharadwaj hosted episodes 17-24. There was no host present in the remaining episodes. Professional chefs Chalapathi Rao, Sanjay Thumma and Mahesh Padala serve as the judges. K. Krishna Tejasvi, a home baker from Hyderabad won the competition, with G. D. Anusha as the runner-up.

Format
From around 5000 applicants, 800 were selected for virtual auditions. One hundred winners were selected for a live audition at Innovative Film City, Bengaluru. The top 20 home cooks were selected from this audition to compete in the MasterChef apron challenge. The winners were placed in the Top 14.

Top 14

Elimination Table

 (WON) The cook won the individual/pair challenge and was safe for the next challenge(s).
 (WON) The cook won the team challenge and was safe for the next challenge(s). 
 (IMN) The cook won/used an Immunity Pin in the challenge.
 (WON) The cook won the individual challenge and was promoted as a finalist.
 (SAFE) The cook did not participate in the challenge as he/she already advanced to the next round.
 (TOP) The cook was one of the top entries in the individual/pair challenge but failed.
 (IN) The cook was not chosen as a top or bottom entry in the individual/pair challenge.
 (IN) The cook was not chosen as a top or bottom entry in the team challenge.
 (WAIT) The cook was waiting for the result.
 (DNP) The cook did not participate in the challenge(s) due to the result of the previous challenge or personal problems.
 (BTM) The cook was one of the bottom entries in the individual challenge and had to compete in the next elimination challenge.
 (BTM) The cook was one of the bottom entries in the team challenge and had to compete in the next elimination challenge.
 (PT) The cook competed in the elimination challenge and advanced.
 (PELM) The cook was eliminated but later given a second chance to participate in an upcoming challenge.
 (ELIM) The cook was eliminated from MasterChef.

Guest Appearances 
 Allu Sirish
 Chef Rajesh Kadakanthala
 V. M. L. Karthikeyan

Episodes

References

External links 
 
 MasterChef India – Telugu (season 1) at Sun NXT

MasterChef India
2021 Indian television seasons
Gemini TV original programming